Sengunthapuram is a small village in Jayankondam (Jayamkonda Chozhapuram), Tamil Nadu, India, with a group of around 700 Sengunthar families staying together.  Its PIN Code is 621802.

Sengunthapuram was formed during the 1940s as a rehabilitation measure by the government for people of the nearby places Marudur, Variyankaval and Elaiyur when they were hit by frequent floods during those periods.

The 100 years celebrating last year 2016. The big celebrating happened continuously. The statue formed by village people for former  founder of sengunthapuram.

References

Villages in Ariyalur district